Rugomenes is a monotypic Indomalayan genus of potter wasps containing a single species, Rugomenes rugifrons.

References

Monotypic Hymenoptera genera
Potter wasps